The Kamerlingh Onnes Award is in recognition of special merits of scientists active in the field of refrigeration technology, cryogenics and more generally low-temperature science and technology. It was founded in 1948 by the Royal Dutch Association of Refrigeration (Koninklijke Nederlandse Vereniging voor Koude, KNVvK) The name of the award is intended to keep the memory of Heike Kamerlingh Onnes alive. The award is assigned typically every four years and the winners get a golden medal and a certificate.

List of recipients
1950 Prof. F. Simon, Oxford, England, Very low temperatures, liquid hydrogen and helium
1958 Prof. S.C. Collins, M.I.T., USA, Low temperatures, especially with regard to equipment for the production of liquid helium
1958 Philips Natuurkundig Laboratorium, Eindhoven, Netherlands, Development of cryogenerator
1963 Dr. F. Kidd and Dr. C. West, Cambridge, England, Research storage conditions of fruit
1968 Prof. P.L. Kapitza, Moscov, Russia, Low temperatures; scientifically and technologically
1973 Ms. Dr. Audrey Smith, Stanmore, England, Introduction of cryoprotectants; cryobiology
1979 Dr. J.E. Kunzler, Bell Labs., USA, Superconductivity
1983 Prof. L. Váhl, Delft, The Netherlands, Refrigeration technology in the broad sense
1988 Ir. T.A. van Hiele, Wageningen, Netherlands, Application of refrigeration technology on agricultural and horticultural products
1989 Dr. H.T. Meryman, American Red Cross, USA, Preservation of blood, tissues and organs
1995 Prof. R. Cohen, Purdue University, USA, Compressor technology and international knowledge transfer
1995 Refrigerator Research group at the Massey University, New Zealand, under Prof. A.C. Cleland, Food refrigeration processes and knowledge transfer
2000 Prof. G. Frossati, Kamerlingh Onnes Lab., Netherlands, Development of cryogenic equipment, in particular as regards dilution refrigerators
2008 Prof. H.C. Kruse, Hannover, Germany, Contributed to technological progress, education and knowledge transfer and did meritorious work for cold and heat pump associations
2008 Prof. A.T.A.M. de Waele, Eindhoven, Netherlands,  Optimization of pulse tube refrigerators for temperatures below 4 K
2012 Dr. P. Lebrun, CERN, Switzerland, For his groundbreaking contributions to the field of cryogenic science and technology, especially making the Large Hadron Collider possible

See also

 List of engineering awards

References

Science and technology awards
Dutch awards